Bajčići is a village in the island of Krk, in the Primorje-Gorski Kotar County, Croatia. Mate Bajčić Gašpović, who was from here, was the last speaker of the Istro-Romanian language in Krk. He died in 1875.

Population

References 

Populated places in Primorje-Gorski Kotar County
Krk